Henry Erskine may refer to:

Henry Erskine (minister) (1624–1696), Scottish Presbyterian minister
Henry Erskine, 3rd Lord Cardross (1650–1693), covenanter
 Sir Henry Erskine, 5th Baronet (c. 1710–1765), Member of Parliament for Ayr Burghs 1749–1754 and Anstruther Easter Burghs 1754–1765
Henry Erskine, 10th Earl of Buchan (1710–1767), Scottish peer
 Henry Erskine (lawyer) (1746–1817), MP for Haddington Burghs from April to November 1806, and for Dumfries Burghs from 1806 to 1807
 Henry Erskine, 12th Earl of Buchan (1783–1857)
 Henry Erskine (priest) (died 1859), second son of Lord Erskine and Anglican dean of Ripon Minster